The Landing Apartments (formerly named Dayton YMCA) is a historic structure located at 117 West Monument Street in Dayton, Ohio. It was designed by Schenck & Williams and added to the National Register of Historic Places on August 25, 1988.

Historic uses 
Domestic
Education
Recreation And Culture
Social

See also
 National Register of Historic Places listings in Dayton, Ohio

References

External links

National Register of Historic Places in Montgomery County, Ohio
Residential buildings on the National Register of Historic Places in Ohio
Buildings and structures in Dayton, Ohio
Skyscrapers in Dayton, Ohio
Residential skyscrapers in Ohio

Buildings and structures completed in 1928